USS Remlik (SP-157) (sometimes spelled Remlick) was a yacht acquired by the U.S. Navy during World War I. She was converted into an armed patrol craft and assigned to protect ships from German submarines in the North Atlantic Ocean. Post-war she was decommissioned, stripped of naval ordnance and sold in Norfolk, Virginia.

Construction, acquisition, and commissioning

Remlik was built as the steam-powered civilian yacht SS Candace in 1903 by Cook, Welton and Gemmell at Hull, England. She later was renamed SS Remlik. The U.S. Navy purchased Remlik from her owner, Willis Sharpe Kilmer of Binghamton, New York, on 1 June 1917 for use as a patrol vessel during World War I. She was delivered to the Navy on 10 June 1917 and, after conversion into a patrol vessel, was commissioned on 11 July 1917 as USS Remlik (SP-157).

United States Navy service

Following commissioning, Remlik got underway for France, where, in the late summer of 1917, she assumed antisubmarine patrol and coastal escort duties in the Bay of Biscay. Originally with the 2nd Patrol Division, she later was transferred to the 8th Patrol Division.

Remlik was on patrol duty, fighting a storm, on the morning of 17 December 1917 when she sighted a German submarine off her starboard beam. The submarine submerged before Remliks gun crews could fire. The submarines periscope reappeared three times, but the extremely rough weather prevented the submarine from firing her torpedoes and she finally disappeared.

Remlik, although prohibited from using her depth charges by her speed - only 2 knots against the gale - remained in the area in the hope that the submarine would reappear. Shortly after the submarine was last seen, however, the depth charge box on Remlicks taffrail aft was washed overboard. Its depth charge, however, fell inboard, lost its safety pin - arming it - and began rolling around on deck. In the ensuing minutes, Chief Boatswains Mate John MacKenzie (1886-1933) ran down the deck and, despite the rolling and pitching of the vessel, got a firm grip on the armed depth charge, put it on end, then sat on it to hold it in place until others could lash it down. Mackenzie was awarded the Medal of Honor for his actions.

Remlik continued her patrols and escorted ships along the French coast through the remainder of World War I.

Decommissioning and disposal

After the end of hostilities, Remlik returned to the United States for inactivation. She was decommissioned at Norfolk, Virginia, on 7 November 1919 and was sold to J. S. Webster of Baltimore, Maryland, on 7 June 1920.

References

Department of the Navy Naval Historical Center Online Library of Selected Images: U.S. Navy Ships: USS Remlik (SP-157), 1917-1920. Formerly the Steam Yacht Candace and Remlik
NavSource Online: Section Patrol Craft Photo Archive: Remlik (SP 157)

Patrol vessels of the United States Navy
World War I patrol vessels of the United States
Ships built on the Humber
Steam yachts
1903 ships